Anupgarh Tehsil is the one of ten tehsils of Sri Ganganagar district in Rajasthan, India. The tehsil headquarters are located at the town of  Anupgarh.

Demographics
People have migrated from other tehsils of Sri Gangagnagar district, and from Bikaner, Punjab and Haryana.

Religion 

Hinduism  and Sikhism are practised by the majority of people. 

As of the Census of India 2011, Anupgarh Tehsil had 184,423 residents, with 153,546 (83.26%) people living in rural areas and 30,877 (16.74%) people living in urban areas. The 2001 census counted a total of 174,413 residents.

As per the Population Census 2011 data, following are some quick facts about Anupgarh Tehsil.

Literacy Rate 

As of the Census of India 2011 the Average literacy rate of Anupgarh Tehsil in 2011 were 66.34% in which, male and female literacy were 75.69% and 55.99% respectively. Total literate in Anupgarh Tehsil were 105,905 of which male and female were 63,473 and 42,432 respectively.

Geography
Anupgarh Tehsil is located in the southern part of Sri Ganganagar District.

Adjacent tehsils
 Raisinghnagar Tehsil (north)
 Vijaynagar Tehsil (east)
 Gharsana Tehsil (southwest)
 Chhatargarh Tehsil, Bikaner District (southeast)
 Haroonabad Tehsil, Bahawalnagar District, Punjab, Pakistan (northwest)
 Fort Abbas Tehsil, Bahawalnagar District, Punjab, Pakistan (southwest)

Physical geography
The northern portion of the tehsil is part of the Nali region, a central area of the Sri Ganganagar District characterized by the flow of the Ghaggar River. The terrain of the southern portion of the tehsil can be characterized by sand dunes. This portion is being irrigated by branches of the Indira Gandhi Canal Project.

Languages
Hindi is the official language. Bagri, a dialect of the Rajasthani language, and Punjabi languages are spoken by the majority of people. Sindhi and Sikh Bawri are also spoken by a few people. Odh and Bawri people speak their unique languages.

Transport
Almost all big villages are connected with roads. Anupgarh and Ramsinghpur are connected with a railway line in this tehsil.

Settlements
Major towns and villages within the tehsil include:
 Anupgarh
 Ramsinghpur (59Gb) a Sub Tehsil of Anupgarh Tehsil
 11L.M.
 Patroda (11P))
 27 A
 80Gb 
 74Gb
 KHALL (4 KAM)

References

External links
 http://beeoanupgarh.webs.com
 https://web.archive.org/web/20110713111748/http://www.mgsubikaner.ac.in/colleges.php

Tehsils of Sri Ganganagar District